is a Japanese publishing company headquartered in Bunkyō, Tokyo, Japan. It was founded on February 1, 1952.

They have published multiple best-selling series, including Guri and Gura and Iyaiyaen by Rieko Nakagawa and the Kiki's Delivery Service series by Eiko Kadono. They also publish in Japan the Peter Rabbit series by Beatrix Potter, The Adventures of Tintin by Hergé, various books featuring the character Miffy, and the My Father's Dragon series by Ruth Stiles Gannett, among others.

Japanese companies established in 1952
Book publishing companies in Tokyo
Magazine publishing companies in Tokyo
Publishing companies established in 1952